Ochindol is a village in Mezdra Municipality in Bulgaria, located about 60 kilometers from the capital city of Sofia along the Iskar River valley, with a population of about 200. It is situated near Vrachanski Balkan Nature Park in the western Balkan Mountains.

The village contains a monument representing Ivan Vazov's character 'Grandfather Yotso', a symbol of the Liberation of Bulgaria from the Ottoman Empire and the progress of independent Bulgaria. In the midst of the Balkan Mountains, Ochindol is a village representative of the region. Recent steps towards developing small-scale tourism in the village and area have succeeded in the construction of a tourist house and eco-trails. The village can be reached by train (about 4 kilometers from the Levishte station) or by car.

References

Villages in Vratsa Province